Umberto Visentin (December 24, 1909 in Treviso – July 27, 1994) was an Italian professional football player and coach.

His older brothers Giuseppe Visentin and Gino Visentin played football professionally, mostly for Treviso. To distinguish them, Giuseppe was known as Visentin I, Gino as Visentin II and Umberto as Visentin III.

Honours
 Serie A champion: 1929/30.

1909 births
1994 deaths
Italian footballers
Serie A players
Treviso F.B.C. 1993 players
Inter Milan players
S.S.C. Napoli players
S.S. Lazio players
Italian football managers
Treviso F.B.C. 1993 managers
Association football midfielders